James Jay Brophy (born July 27, 1960) is a former American football linebacker who played at the University of Miami, and four seasons in the National Football League (NFL), mainly for the Miami Dolphins.

High school career
Brophy attended John R. Buchtel High School in Akron, Ohio and was a letterman in football and basketball.

Brophy is currently head coach of the Manchester High School high school football team in New Franklin, Ohio. 

.

1960 births
Living people
American football linebackers
Miami Dolphins players
Miami Hurricanes football players
Players of American football from Akron, Ohio
National Football League replacement players